Real Blondes were a short lived Australian pop trio. They released two singles and had a campaign with Impulse fragrance.

Career
Real Blondes formed in 1999 in an internet chat room before meeting in person. Kelly Webb's mother had written "We B Cool" and they recorded it at the Webb house. The trio were signed to Epic Records and released "We B Cool" in August 1999.

Their second single, "I Won't Let Go" was released in June 2000 and peaked at number 39 on the ARIA Charts.

Discography

Singles

References

1999 establishments in Australia
2001 disestablishments in Australia
Musical groups established in 1999
Musical groups disestablished in 2001